Maria Júlia Coutinho (born August 10, 1978), commonly known as Maju Coutinho, is a Brazilian journalist, television presenter, and commentator.

Biography
Maria Júlia holds a degree in Journalism from Faculdade Cásper Líbero and was a trainee at Fundação Padre Anchieta, where she went through various positions until she became a reporter.

In 2005, she started presenting the Jornal da Cultura with Heródoto Barbeiro. Later, she was transferred to the Cultura Meio-Dia television news show, which she presented with Laila Dawa and Vladir Lemos. In 2007, she moved to Rede Globo where she initially returned to the reports.

In 2013, Maju was successful as a meteorology presenter and became the holder of the station, eventually presenting the climatic forecasts of Jornal Hoje and Jornal Nacional. It also covered the weather forecasts for Hora Um da Notícia and Bom Dia Brasil, being replaced by Izabella Camargo.

In April 2015, she was displaced for the live presentation of the weather forecast of Jornal Nacional. In 2015, she became part of the SPTV (pt) host family. In January 2016 was chosen by the team of the newspaper O Globo like personality of the year in the category Segundo caderno/+TV. In March 2016, Maju received the Faz Diferença award. On June 10, 2017, she took over as the occasional presenter of Jornal Hoje.

Career

Controversies
On July 3, 2015, Maria Júlia Coutinho came to be the target of racist comments that provoked repulsion in large part of the population of Brazil. The hashtag: #SomostodosMaju (#WeAreAllMaju) had wide repercussions in social networks and the case was exposed in the Jornal Nacional by the anchors William Bonner and Renata Vasconcellos in her own presence.

Awards

References 

1978 births
Living people
People from São Paulo
Afro-Brazilian people
Brazilian television news anchors